Parseghian (Պարսէքյան) is an Armenian surname. Notable people with the surname include:

Ara Parseghian (1923–2017), American college football player and coach
Kegham Parseghian (1883–1915), Armenian writer, teacher and journalist
Nathan Parseghian (born 1984), former placekicker for the Miami Redhawks and great grand-nephew of Ara Parseghian

See also
 Barseghyan

Armenian-language surnames